Micah Cornwallace Wilkinson (born 6 February 1996) is a New Zealand sailor. He competed in the Multihull – Nacra 17 event at the 2020 Summer Olympics with Erica Dawson.

References

External links 
 
 
 
 

1996 births
Living people
New Zealand male sailors (sport)
Olympic sailors of New Zealand
Sailors at the 2020 Summer Olympics – Nacra 17
Sportspeople from Cambridge, New Zealand
Sportspeople from Hamilton, New Zealand